Julio Alberto Amores Palacios (born 12 March 1993) is a Spanish road and track cyclist, who currently rides for Spanish amateur team U.C. Novelda. He competed in the scratch event at the 2014 UCI Track Cycling World Championships.

References

External links
 
 

1993 births
Living people
Spanish track cyclists
Spanish male cyclists
People from Vinalopó Mitjà
Sportspeople from the Province of Alicante
Cyclists from the Valencian Community
21st-century Spanish people